Volleyball was contested for men only at the 1935 Central American and Caribbean Games in San Salvador, El Salvador.

References
 

1935 Central American and Caribbean Games
1935
1935 in volleyball
International volleyball competitions hosted by El Salvador